Gradski fudblski klub Dubočica, commonly known as Dubočica, is a Serbian football club based in the southern city of Leskovac, which competes in the third division Serbian League East. The club's name derives from a traditional synonym for Leskovac and the surrounding region.

History

Early years (1923–1941)
On May Day, 1924 the trade unionist and revolutionary Kosta Stamenković initiated the establishment of a football physical-cultural society in Leskovac, Kingdom of Serbs, Croats and Slovenes. The club's explicit aim was the propagation of Marxists-Leninist ideology amongst the working-class youth of Leskovac, and to serve as a front for assembling members of the underground Communist Party of Yugoslavia. Radnički sportski klub Crvena zastava (English: Workers Sporting Club Red Flag) was co-founded by Kosta Stamenković, first club president Jovan Živković, and ten other trade unionists during an annual meeting on 20 August 1923.

The new club came under immediate suspicion by the authorities who refused to register the association due to its overtly political name and membership, nonetheless RSK Red Flag continued playing unofficial matches, the first-ever being a 3–2 win over Jug Bogdan from Prokupje in August 1923. Red Flag changed its name the following year to Radnički sportski klub Proleter (English: Workers Sporting Club Proletarian), but continued having issues with the authorities and failed to have its registration approved.

On 18 January 1925, RSK Proleter officially changed its name to Leskovački radnički sportski klub Sloboda (English: Leskovac Sporting Club Liberty), this time the club's registration was excepted by the Belgrade Football Subassociation, and the club was allowed to compete in the Morava District League for season 1925–26 under instructions that further political activism would lead to its suspension. On 28 March 1925 the club played its first officially recognized match, losing 4–1 to visiting Radnički Kragujevac.

Following the 6 January dictatorship of King Alexander I, LRSK Sloboda decided to alter its name midway through season 1928–29 to Građanski sport klub Sloboda (English: Citizens Sport Club Liberty), that same season Sloboda celebrated its first title finishing top of the Morava District. After only three months GSK Sloboda underwent yet another name change, this time to Leskovački sport klub Građanski (English: Leskovac Sport Club Citizens), after being accused of speeding "Communist propaganda" by fellow rivals GSK Momčilo.

Građanski were sitting first midway season 1931–32 in the newly established Leskovac District League when the club was accused by rivals OSK Josif, and Momčilo of clandestine revolutionary activity and hooliganism. Due to these accusations, Građanski was suppressed by the authorities. Following failed attempts at registration Kosta Stamenković approached Dimitrije Nikolić, president of the newly renamed Romani club, Leskovački sportski klub Dubočica (previously SK Veternica), to forge a mutually beneficial merger. A general meeting was held between the two club's on 10 March 1932 with Nikolić agreeing to the proposition, believing the inclusion of the defunct Građanski would strengthen Dubočica, however strong opposition to the merger was aired from Romani members who were against any merger, refusing to play alongside "dissidents" and mix with "white's". A compromised proposal of fielding segregated team's was rejected with the Romani boycotting the meeting and later forming the football club "Gajret".

The latter interwar period was a successful one as the Crveni were crowned Leskovac District League champions in season's 1935–36, 1937–38, and 1938–39. On-field triumphs were marred by internal disagreement following the merger of town rivals Fabrički klub Jugoslavija with Dubočica on 15 June 1939. The internal dispute led to the ousting of Dimitrije Nikolić and the election of Kosta Stamenković as new club president.

Wartime football (1941–1944)
On 11 April 1941 Leskovac was occupied by the German Army. As active Communists, the club's leadership including Kosta Stamenković, Vlada Đorđević and Stanimir Veljković went underground, whilst many club members and sympathisers were arrested, others joining the Partisan resistance. Dubočica had diminished during the occupation but continued competing, even winning the impeded 1940–41 district league. In October 1941 the team playing a secret friendly match between Grafičar for the purpose of raising funds for the local Partisan Detachment.

On 26 March 1942 tragedy struck Dubočica as club president Stamenković committed suicide during a gunfight with Chetniks who had surrounded him in the village of Šilovo. Dubočica's 1943–44 District League title was further overshadowed by the arrest of club members on suspicious illegal activities and by August 1944 most remaining players had joined the resistance.

Ups and downs (1944–1968)
Dubočica became the foremost football team in Leskovac following the city's liberation on 11 October 1944. Many rival club's were suppressed, whilst Dubočica was allowed to function due to its ties with the new regime. In 1945 the club changed its name to Radnički sport klub Kosta Stamenković (English: Worker's Sport Club Kosta Stamenković), in honor of the fallen club co-founder and president.

RSK Kosta Stamenković won the 1946 district league twice, the first a slapdash tournament featuring only two other clubs, whilst the second featured six. The club entered the regional Serbian Championship (Group III) for season 1946–47 and incorporated fellow city rivals Omladinac into its ranks. 1947 witnessed the club's Yugoslav Cup debut, being eventually eliminated away by rivals Radnički Niš in an epic 7–5 encounter. RSK Kosta Stamenković won the 1948–49 Serbian Championship (Zone V), but we're unsuccessful in qualifying for the Serbian League for the second year running, after losing 1–0 in neutral Kruševac in a match deciding the previous 3–3 aggregate playoff against Radnički Kragujevac. Due to the proclamation of Kosta Stamenković as a National Hero of Yugoslavia on 14 December 1949, a decision was made by the club to revert to its previous name of Dubočica.

Dubočica qualified for the Serbian Football League in 1950 after a two leg play-off against Jedinstvo, winning 7–0 on aggregate. Celebrations were short-lived with the team finishing 13th with only 9 points, culminating in Dubočica's relegation to the Niš Football Subasociation. In 1953 Dubočica won the Leskovac Cup and had a memorable 3–2 win over then Yugoslav First League champions Red Star Belgrade in a club friendly. Dubočica reveled in its 5–1 derby win against Radnički Niš when the two sides met during the 1954 Yugoslav Cup, but ultimately lost again in the preliminary round to Kosovo. Dubočica won back-to-back Niš Football Subasociation titles in 1954–55 and 1955–56 thereby gaining promotion to the Yugolsav Second League (Zone IV). 1956 also witnessed the mergers of LSK (formerly Tekstilac) with Dubočica for the purpose of strengthening the squad for the upcoming season.

With only four matches till season's end Dubočica were found guilty of match fixing in the 1957–58 Yugoslav Second Division (Zone IV), following an 8–0 drubbing of Sloga Skopje. As a result, the club was fined and relegated to the Niš Football Zone. A fitting testimonial match was held in 1959 to honour then captain Svetislav Jovanović, and Borivoje Golubović who both marked 10 years with the team. That year also witnessed the retirement of club legend Stanko Filipović who debuted as a fifteen-year-old in 1935, and had captained Dubočica since 1939.

Dubočica were 1959–60 Niš Football Zone champions, but failed to gain promotion to the second division after a surprise 8–3 aggregate defeat over two legs to Rudar. Dubočica managed to reach the Serbian finals in 1960 but lost 5–0 to Sloga Kraljevo, and again in 1962 losing 3–1 to Borac Čačak thereby falling out of the Yugoslav Cup preliminary round. Dubočica greatly benefited from a competition restructure for the 1962–63 season, as the club was placed in the Serbian League (Group South), where it competed amongst teams from Central Serbia and Kosovo. Dubočica finished a respectable third in its first two seasons, but the club became plagued by a revolving door of coaches, slumping to a 12th-place finish in 1964–65 which culminating in a player exodus from the club. The crisis continued in 1965–66 after a horrible season in which Dubočica finished 14th and suffered relegation. Dubočica fought its way back winning the 1966–67 Niš Football Zone, successfully returning to the Serbian Football League (Group South), with a fifth-place finish in 1967–68. The team qualified for the 1967 Yugoslav Cup after a five-year absence, but were eliminated in the preliminaries by Železničar Niš 3–2.

The pride of Leskovac (1968–1983)
The Football Association of Yugoslavia undertook a restructure of the league system for the 1968–69 season that enabled Dubočica's debut in the Yugoslav Second League. With Miloš Milutinović at the helm the Leskovčani finishing in 7th place, and replicated the same league table position the following year.

Dubočica triumphed in the Niš-Leskovac derby beating rivals Radnički in the 1970 Serbian FA Cup Final, winning 3–0 away at Čair Stadium and advancing to the round of sixteen of the 1971 Yugoslav Cup, but we're eventually eliminated after losing 1–0 away to Sloboda Tuzla. Despite some solid performances in the league, the team could only managed a disappointing 10th-place finish on the table at season's end.

The challenging times continued for the club after a poor start to its campaign amid coach Milutinović's resignation midseason 1971–72, which lead to Dubočica's relegation from the second tire after a disastrous 17th-place finish. Though the club was in the midst of a rebuilding phase, Dubočica were adamantly vying for a chance to regain promotion to the second tire. The team won the 1972–73 Serbian Football League (Group South) in their first season following relegation, but lost in the two leg playoff to (Group North) champions FK Rad. Dubočica competed in the revamped third tier First Serbian League in season 1973–74, fishing second and back-to-back champions in 1975 and 1976, thereby earning promotion via playoff back into the Yugoslav Second League after a four-year absence.

Upon returning to the second tire the team scarcely survived a challenging campaign finishing in 14th place. Under the management of former player Ljubiša Stefanović, Dubočica achieved its best result, finishing the 1977–78 league session in 4th place. In a campaign marked by outstanding performances, and passionate local support, the team narrowly missing out on promotion to the First Division. The Crveni were unable to match their successful run the following season, and ended 9th on the table. In both 1980 and 1981 the team hovered in 11th spot, whilst a downturn in fortune lead Dubočica to a 13th placing on the Second League ladder.

The 1970s and early 1980s era was defined by club legends such as forward Božidar Stefanović, midfielder and playmaker Ivan Bošković, alongside steadfast defenders Zoran Banković and Stojan Gavrilović. The years spent in the Yugoslav Second League are regarded as the club's most successful era to date until Dubočica suffered relegated at the end of the 1982–83 season.

Fading fortunes (1983–2011)
Dubočica competed in the First Serbian League for five seasons (1983–1988) until the establishment of the Inter-Republic League (East), where they finishing season 1988–89 in 4th spot.

After nine years playing third division football Dubočica were promoted to the restructured Second League of FR Yugoslavia in 1992, due to the ensuing civil war. Despite being relegated in season 1994–95, Dubočica returned to the second tire in 1996, but after a dismal season were relegated yet again. The yoyoing trend continued as the club made another Second League comeback in season 1999–2000 until once again suffering relegation to the third tier Serbian League East after finishing bottom of the league in the 2002–03 season.

Dubočica meet old rivals Radnički Niš during the 18th round of the 2010–11 Serbian League East. The match was marred by an all-out brawl between ultras in the stands that spilled onto the field of the Leskovac City Stadium. Radnički won the match 2–1, which is to date the last darby played between the southern rivals. Dubočica unfortunately finishing the session in 14th place and was relegated to the fourth division Niš Zone.

Demise and revival (2011–present)
Playing under the new name Dubočica 1923, the team managed a second-place finish in the Niš Zone League and returned to the third division after finishing in a respectable 6th. The next season was followed up with a horrendous campaign which saw the Leskovčani finishing dead last in the 2013–14 Serbian League East.

It had become apparent that the club was facing serious financial turmoil. Decades of regional economic depression, club mismanagement and dept finally took its toll as Dubočica was deemed unsustainable and dissolved after 91 years of existence.

Shocked by the club's dissolution, a group of Leskovac community and business leaders, alongside club fans and sports enthusiasts established an initiative to revive the football club. Within a year of Dubočica's demise, the collective succeeded in forming the successor team Gradski fudbalski klub Dubočica (English: City Football Club Dubočica).

The newly registered GFK Dubočica began season 2015–16 by winning the lowly fifth tier Jablanica District League, thereby gaining promotion. Dubočica were crowned the Zone League South champions after two seasons and achieved promotion this time to the third tier Serbian League East in 2018–19.

In September 2019 President of Serbia Aleksandar Vučić announced the planned redevelopment of Dubočica's dilapidated stadium as part of a regional assistance program for the city of Leskovac. The new stadium will be built according to UEFA standards with a minimum capacity of 8,000, and is scheduled for completion by 2021.

Dubočica's aspirations of securing promotion to the Serbian First League were hindered after a poor start to the 2019–20 season, with coach Milan Đorđević resigning after securing just 9 points in 9 rounds. Đorđević was subsequently replaced by former Dubočica player and coach Dragan Stanković "Šimi". The Football Association of Serbia made the decision to suspend the league in round 17 due to the COVID-19 pandemic. During the interruption Aleksandar Kuzmanović was announced as new coach, whilst the FA announced Dubočica's promotion to the second tire Serbian First League for season 2020–21. Kuzmanović resigned after failing to secure a win for the newly promoted side. He was replaced by Saša Mrkić in September 2020. The club's lackluster performance continued throughout the season with Mrkić resigning following a 1-0 home defeat to Radnički Sremska Mitrovica in Round 31. Dubočica were relegated alongside 8 other clubs despite ending the season in 12th place. Dubočica hired new coach Slaviša Božičić as it embark in the Serbian League East 2021-22. Despite leading the club to the Serbian Cub round of 16 in which Dubočica lost 1-0 to Serbian SuperLiga leaders FK Partizan, Božičić and the club parted ways during the winter break as the team was sitting in 6th place and 14 points behind league leaders Trayal Kruševac. Božičić was replaced by former Dubočica and Yugoslav national team player Marko Perović.

Crest and colours
The club crest is framed in bronze with six points. The white diagonal half of the emblem has the abbreviation "GFK" (ГФК) and "Dubočica" (ДУБОЧИЦА) in Cyrillic red lettering, whilst a bronze and white coloured football (previously a red star) rests at the top of the crest. The red diagonal portion features "Leskovac" (ЛЕСКОВАЦ) also in Cyrillic rendering in white letters. The year of establishment, "1923", is written in white at the bottom half of the crest. It is surrounded by a graphic representation of a bronze cog-like factory building with a smoking chimney stack.

The club kit has traditionally consisted of the colours red and white.

Stadium
The club's home ground is City Stadium (Gradski stadion), commonly referred to as "Stadion Dubočica". Located south-east of the Leskovac city center, it features a 2,514 capacity western stand, while the eastern terrace holds approximately 4,500 standing spectators. The stadium is owned buy the municipality and has for decades been in a state of disrepair due to meager funding. The stadium lacks floodlights, and electricity, while the hazardous eastern terrace suffers from repeated acts of trespass and vandalism. The construction of a new 8,000 capacity stadium began in 2021. Construction was enitialy delayed due to COVID-19 restrictions.

Supporters and rivalries
Dubočica was traditionally known as the working-class club of Leskovac. During the interwar period the team had bitter rivalries with SK Momčilo and SK Josif, two club's which represented the local middle class. During this era the club also developed long-standing rivalries with teams from Niš, particularly Radnički and FK Vlasina from neighbouring Vlasotince.

Dubočica's status improved significantly after World War II as most of its city rivals were disbanded by the Communists. Property and training grounds were allocated to Dubočica which became a prominent sporting institution for the youth of Leskovac. The club enjoyed a solid following whilst playing in the Yugoslav Second League during the golden era of the 1970s and 1980s, however, due to poor performance and the general state of Serbian football active support has dwindled.

Dubočica is the oldest football club in Leskovac and still maintains a level of sympathy within the local community. A devoted ultras group known as "Leskovac Wolves" (Serbian Cyrillic: Вукови Лесковац), regularly support the team at home and away fixtures.

Dubočica contest the Leskovac derby with fellow city rivals Sloga Leskovac and Lemind 1953. The club also maintains a rivalry with fellow south Serbian clubs Dinamo Vranje and Radnički Pirot.

Players

Current squad

Honours

National
First Serbian League (2): 1974–75, 1975–76
Serbian Football League (Group South) (1): 1972–73
People's Republic of Serbia Championship (Zone V) (1): 1948–49
Football Association of SR Serbia Cup (1): 1970

Regional
Leskovac District League (7): 1935–36, 1937–38, 1938–39, 1940–41, 1943–44, 1946, 1946
Leskovac City Cup (7): 1939, 1953, 1954, 1955, 1961, 1961, 1962
South Morava Brigade Cup (3): 1953, 1954, 1955
Niš Football Zone (2): 1959–60, 1966–67
Niš Football Subassociation (2): 1954–55, 1955–56
Zone League South (1): 2017–18
Jablanica District League (1): 2015–16
Morava District League (1): 1928–29

Notable players
National team players
  Zoran Banković
  Marko Perović
  Aleksandar Kocić
  Radivoje Manić
  Bratislav Živković
  Miloš Kocić (youth)
  Saša Stamenković
  Marko Momčilović
  Aleksandar Filipović (youth)
  Ibrahim Salim Saad
For a list of all FK Dubočica players with a Wikipedia article, see :Category:FK Dubočica players.

References

External links
 FK Dubočica and GFK Dubočica at Srbijasport
 GFK Dubočica at Srbijafudbal

1923 establishments in Serbia
Association football clubs established in 1923
Football clubs in Serbia
Sport in Leskovac